Redistricting in Texas is the process by which boundaries are redrawn for Texas House of Representatives districts, Texas Senate districts, Texas Board of Education districts, and Texas's congressional districts. Redistricting occurs—as in other U.S. states—once every decade, usually in the year after the decennial United States census. According to the Texas Constitution, redistricting in Texas follows the regular legislative process, it must be passed by both houses of the Texas Legislature and signed by the Governor of Texas—unless the Legislature has sufficient votes to override a gubernatorial veto. Like many other states in the American South after the passage of the Voting Rights Act of 1965, federal judges and the United States Supreme Court have stricken down Texas' congressional and legislative districts on multiple occasions, including in the 1960s, 1970s, 1980s, 1990s, and 2000s.

The most recent redistricting occurred in October 2021, when Republican governor Greg Abbott signed maps passed by the Republican-controlled legislature for the 2022–2031 decade. The maps that passed were widely criticized as racial and partisan gerrymanders designed to keep Republicans in power and reduce the voting power of minorities.

Background 
Reapportionment of representatives between the states every ten years based on new census figures is required by Article I, Section 2 of the U.S. Constitution and Section 2 of the Fourteenth Amendment. The Constitution, Supreme Court jurisprudence, and federal law allow significant latitude to the individual states to draw their congressional and legislative districts as they see fit, as long as each district contains roughly equivalent numbers of people (see Baker v. Carr, Wesberry v. Sanders, and Reynolds v. Sims) and provides for minority representation pursuant to the Voting Rights Act.

Article III of the Constitution of Texas mandates that redistricting must occur in the first legislative session following the publication of a new enumeration by the United States census. The House of Representatives must have 150 members and the Senate must have 31 members. Additionally, districts for the state House of Representatives must follow the "county line rule." Counties are allocated districts based on their population. Counties with sufficient population for exactly one district must be fully contained within that district. Counties with sufficient population for two or more districts must be divided into that number of districts. Should a county have sufficient population for one or more district plus a fraction of another, one district from another county may extend into it to represent the remaining population.

Process 
The redistricting process begins with each decennial census, when the U.S. government provides detailed census tract data to the states, usually by March 1 of the first year of the decade. The Texas Legislative Council provides this census data to legislators, who then use a computer program to draw district boundaries. Legislators then pass these boundaries into law as they would any other bill. Redistricting bills for each state legislative chamber typically originate in their respective chambers. If state legislative boundaries are not enacted by the legislature during the regular session, the Legislative Redistricting Board, consisting of the governor, speaker of the House, attorney general, comptroller, and land commissioner, will pass its own plan, subject to the governor's veto.

The legislature may alter the maps it passes later in the decade through mid-decade redistricting. This may occur in response to judicial action against the legislature's previously passed maps or to gain political advantage through gerrymandering, as was the case in 2003 after Republicans took full control of the Texas Legislature.

History 
Texas' original state legislative districts were enacted by its 1845 Constitution. Immediately after convening for the first time, the Texas Legislature enacted its first set of congressional districts. The state was apportioned two districts until its secession in 1861. During this time period, the legislature also regularly revised its House and Senate districts. After its secession, the state sent six representatives to the Confederate States Congress. During Reconstruction, the 1869 Texas Constitution apportioned the state four seats in the United States House of Representatives. The state only had one set of legislative districts, with each district electing one senator and two to four representatives. Texas' current redistricting system would be established by its 1876 Constitution.

1876 Constitution 
The 1876 Constitution established the Texas Senate with 31 members. The Texas House of Representatives was given 93 members, but this number would increase over the years until it reached 150 in 1923. House districts included single-member, multi-member, and floterial districts. Both chambers enacted new districts after every census through the 1920 census, although the Senate's 1911 plan was vetoed by governor Oscar Branch Colquitt. The legislature did not enact reapportionment bills for the House or Senate after the 1930 or 1940 census. In 1948, voters passed a constitutional amendment to create the Legislative Redistricting Board in the event that legislative redistricting failed following a census. Following this, the legislature would successfully enact redistricting plans after the 1950 and 1960 census.

Following the end of Reconstruction, Texas' government was controlled entirely by the Democratic Party, giving them full control over the state's congressional redistricting process. Following the 1880 census, the legislature adopted a redistricting plan giving the state 11 congressional districts. The state gained two districts in 1890 and an additional three in 1900. The legislature revised its 1901 redistricting plan in 1909 before gaining an additional two seats after the 1910 census. These two seats were elected at-large until the 1918 elections. The new districts led to the defeat of at-large congressman A. Jeff McLemore, who had drawn the ire of his own party for his opposition to World War I.

Congress failed to pass reapportionment legislation after the 1920 census, leaving states with the same number of congressional districts as they had been apportioned under the 1910 census. It was only after the passage of the Apportionment and Census Act of 1929 that states were reapportioned congressional districts after the 1930 census. Texas gained three seats in the House of Representatives as a result, but it did not pass redistricting legislation until 1933, so the new congressmen were elected at-large in the 1932 elections. These new districts remained in place until 1957, with one at-large seat being added after the 1950 census.

The 1957 plan created the 22nd congressional district, made up of the southern half of Harris County. This was the first time that a congressional district split part of a county. All prior congressional districts had been made up exclusively of whole counties. This led to large disparities between the populations of rural and suburban districts, as urban districts had not been split to give the counties multiple districts before. These disparities, and others like them across the country, were criticized by then-president Harry S. Truman as unrepresentative in 1951. By 1962, the 5th congressional district, encompassing all of Dallas County, was the most populous congressional district in the country.

While the Texas Legislature had exercised unfettered control over the redistricting process for decades, this would soon come to an end with the rise of the civil rights movement and the passage of federal voting rights legislation.

Civil rights era (1960s) 
On March 26, 1962, the Supreme Court of the United States held in Baker v. Carr that redistricting qualifies as a justiciable question under the equal protection clause of the Fourteenth Amendment, thus enabling federal courts to hear Fourteenth Amendment-based redistricting cases. In 1963, a Federal Court ruled in Bush v. Martin that Texas' congressional districts violated the "one man, one vote" principle, ordering them to be redrawn. Democratic governor John Connally refused to comply with this order, and the state appealed to the Supreme Court. Texas lost its appeal, and the Court ordered the Texas Legislature to redraw its congressional districts. A lower trial court had previously ordered all of Texas' congressional seats to be filled at-large for the 1964 elections, but the Supreme Court allowed the state to ask for relief from this order. The lower court granted this request given Texas' upcoming primary elections, allowing the elections to be held under the old lines. The Texas Legislature enacted new congressional districts in 1965, giving additional districts to both Dallas and Houston, in line with the court's equal representation requirements. These districts were ruled constitutional, but the legislature revised a few districts in 1967.

In 1964, the Supreme Court case Reynolds v. Sims applied the "one man, one vote" principle to state legislative districts. Later, in 1965, a U.S. District Court ruled in Kilgarlin v. Martin that floterial districts were unconstitutional and that the county-based apportionment of Senate districts created unconstitutional population disparities. For example, Harris County contained one Senate district when its population should have given it four. The at-large nature of the district and Texas' runoff system meant that, despite Houston's large minority population, minorities would not be elected to the legislature from the district as whites still made up a majority of the county's population. After the legislature enacted new districts in 1965 to comply with the ruling, Harris county gained three senators and eleven representatives. The new 11th Senate district, with an African American population of 48%, elected Barbara Jordan to the Texas Senate, the first African American senator since Reconstruction, and the first African American woman ever elected to the Senate.

Federal court intervention (1970s) 
Federal courts once again challenged the proportionality of Texas' congressional districts in White v. Weiser, but the Supreme Court stayed the challenge until after the 1972 elections. A District Court had ruled the legislature's districts unconstitutional due to their average population deviation of 0.745%, which violated the one man, one vote principle established by Wesberry v. Sanders. The District Court had also ruled against the Texas Legislature's incumbency protection justification for the district's deviation, but this ruling was not held upon appeal to the Supreme Court. The Supreme Court placed the lower court in charge of redrawing the map, which it did in time for the 1974 elections. After the 1974 elections, the legislature passed the court's districts into law, but they modified the boundaries District 2 and District 6 to move the town of Streetman, which is on the border of Navarro County and Freestone County, fully within the boundaries of District 6.

The Texas Legislature passed maps for the State House of Representatives in 1971, but it did not pass State Senate maps, forcing the Legislative Redistricting Board to convene for the first time to draw the chamber's maps. The map for the Senate passed the scrutiny of the courts, but the map for the House did not. Republicans sued the state over the House's map, alleging that it violated the state's "county line rule." The Supreme Court of Texas in Smith v. Craddick agreed with the Republicans and struck down the House's map. Additionally, the Supreme Court in Mauzy v. Legislative Redistricting Board ordered the Legislative Redistricting Board to reapportion the House because the House's map was struck down, constituting the "[failure] to make such apportionment" that calls the Board into action.

A Federal Court in Graves v. Barnes and White v. Regester then struck down the multi-member districts in Dallas County and Bexar County as tools to diminish the voting power of minorities in those counties. Although the state opposed the notion that the multi-member districts discriminated against minorities, claiming that the districts were a means to make the redistricting process easier, the same district court in 1974 would invalidate all of the state's multi-member districts in Graves v. Barnes. The Legislature would later draw a map composed solely of single-member districts, used from the 1976 to the 1980 elections.

Rising Republican power (1980s) 

In 1978, Republican Bill Clements was elected governor of Texas, ending Democrats' century-long hold of the office and their governmental trifecta. Republicans saw Clements' win as a vital tool to fight back against Democratic gerrymandering in the state. This divided government caused many to foresee difficulty in the state's 1980 redistricting cycle, and the process attracted the attention of many prominent members of the U.S. House. The Legislature failed to adopt new congressional districts during the regular legislative session in 1981 due to conflict between liberal and conservative Democrats. During a special session in 1981, conservative Democrats voted with Republicans on a plan supported by governor Clements. Most contentious during this session was the transfer of African-American voting precincts from District 5 to District 24 in the Dallas area. Though Republicans supported the establishment of the minority opportunity district, it was seen by many Democrats as a tactical political move to increase the Republican lean of the 5th District. The map that passed was intended to give Republicans three to four more seats in Texas' congressional delegation, as well as to give African Americans one more seat.

The adopted congressional districts were challenged by the U.S. Department of Justice in a District Court in Upham v. Seamon. Under preclearance established by Section 5 of the Voting Rights Act of 1965, they asserted that the boundaries of District 15 and District 27 were racially gerrymandered. The court ruled in favor of the Department of Justice, and it drew its own map, which established two districts in Dallas County where African-Americans made up a substantial proportion of the voting-age population. The case was appealed to the Supreme Court, and it remanded the case back to the District Court, but the ruling was made so close to the May primary election that the District Court's maps were allowed to stand for the 1982 elections. The Legislature modified other districts for the 1984 elections, keeping the court-modified districts in place.

The Texas Legislature passed legislative redistricting bills in 1981, but governor Clements vetoed the Senate map, and the State Supreme Court struck down the House map for violating the "county line rule." The Legislative Redistricting Board drew maps for both chambers, which were challenged by lawsuits in Terrazas v. Clements. Additionally, the Justice Department blocked both maps for violating the Voting Rights Act. Given the imminence of the March primary, the courts allowed the Senate maps to be used for the 1982 elections, but it forced modifications to House districts in Bexar County and El Paso County. In 1983, the Legislature adopted the court's modified House maps into law. It also altered eight Senate districts to avoid a full reapportionment, which would have necessitated re-electing all senators in 1984. The courts approved both plans.

Final Democratic gerrymander (1990s) 

In 1990, Democrat Ann Richards was elected governor of Texas, succeeding Bill Clements, who had won a second, non-consecutive term in 1986. Democratic State Senator Eddie Bernice Johnson chaired the redistricting subcommittee and drew maps with the intention of creating a minority-majority district in Dallas for herself to run in. This drew the ire of representatives Martin Frost and John Wiley Bryant, whose districts would become considerably more White and Republican-leaning as a result. A majority-Hispanic district was also created in Houston alongside District 18, a majority-Black district. The Texas Legislature sided with Johnson's plan and adopted new congressional districts during a special session in 1991. Republicans criticized the maps for protecting Democratic incumbents, and others sued over the map's use of census data that may have undercounted minority populations. Despite this, the Justice Department granted the maps preclearance, and the maps were used in the 1992 elections.

In early 1994, several Republicans sued the state alleging that District 18 and District 29 were racially gerrymandered. District 30 was later added to the case, and in August, a federal judicial panel ordered the state to redraw its congressional districts. A separate panel later allowed the struck districts to be used for the 1994 elections, but it ordered the state to redraw its districts before the 1996 elections. The state later appealed this decision, and it became the Supreme Court case Bush v. Vera. During the 1994 elections, Republicans won a majority of the statewide popular vote, but Democrats won the majority of Texas' congressional districts. Bush v. Vera ruled that districts such as District 18 and District 30 were racially gerrymandered. A prior district court decision had voided the results of the 1996 primary elections in 13 districts, which the Supreme Court upheld. These districts instead conducted special elections concurrent with the 1996 elections in the other districts. Despite never winning the statewide popular vote again, Democrats continued to hold their majority in Texas' congressional delegation throughout the decade.

Republican's similarly accused Democrats of gerrymandering the state's legislative maps. Unlike with the state's congressional maps, however, Republicans were successful, as courts completely overhauled the Senate map and partially overhauled the House map. Democrats attempted to pass a new map in January 1992 for the courts to approve, but they rejected this offer and imposed their own maps. Republicans saw the new maps as their best opportunity to win control of the Senate for the first time since Reconstruction. While Republicans did not win control in the 1992 elections, they won 13 of the 16 seats they would have needed to do so, a gain of four from the 1990 elections.

In 1994, the legislature ran for election under the seats passed during the January 1992 session. As the Senate map was completely different from the 1992 map, all senators were required to run for re-election, instead of only half of them. The 1995 lawsuit Thomas v. Bush further altered the maps, as the courts reached a settlement with the legislature to alter some districts for the 1996 elections. These changes, plus a few minor ones, were passed into law and precleared for the 1998 and 2000 elections. Republicans won 15 Senate seats during the 1996 general election, and their victory in a December runoff gave them control of the chamber for the first time in 124 years, splitting the Texas Legislature between the Republican-controlled Senate and the Democratic-controlled House.

Divided government (2001) 
Democrats narrowly maintained control of the Texas House of Representatives after the 2000 election after heavily emphasizing it as necessary to protect the party from a potential Republican gerrymander. During the 2001 regular session, the divided legislature failed to pass any redistricting plans. Congressional redistricting fell to the courts after no special session was called to address redistricting. While the court's initial map appeared to benefit Republicans, the final maps ordered for the 2002 elections allowed Democrats to maintain their majority in the state's congressional delegation. Legislative redistricting fell to the Legislative Redistricting Board after no special session was called. The board's initial plans were seen as advantageous to Republicans, challenges by MALDEF and the Department of Justice altered the board's House districts, while keeping the Senate map intact.

While Democrats had won a victory with the state's congressional districts, it would be short-lived, as Republicans won control of the Texas House of Representatives and made major gains in the Texas Senate in 2002, giving them a governmental trifecta for the first time since Reconstruction.

Republican takeover (2003) 

After Republicans took full control of the Texas Legislature, they attempted to pass a mid-decade redistricting bill near the end of the 2003 regular session. In response, 58 Democratic members of the House of Representatives boycotted the session and left the capitol to deprive the chamber of a quorum, preventing the Republican-led chamber from functioning. House Speaker Tom Craddick ordered the arrest of the missing lawmakers. 53 of those members, later known as the "Killer D's," fled to a Holiday Inn in Ardmore, Oklahoma to continue depriving the House of a quorum, attracting the attention of national media, as well as Democrats in the U.S. House of Representatives, who praised their actions. The efforts later received support from the state's Hispanic chambers of commerce. After the regular session ended, Republican governor Rick Perry called a special session to address redistricting.

House Democrats were unable to stage another walkout during the first special session, but Senate Democrats were able to filibuster the bill until the end of the session. Knowing that Perry would immediately call a second special session after the end of the first, scheduling the session such that they could not filibuster the redistricting package, eleven Democratic members of the Texas Senate (the entire Democratic minority except for Ken Armbrister) chartered a plane and flew to Albuquerque, New Mexico prior to the beginning of the session to prevent a quorum. The "Texas Eleven," as they were called," received support from Democrats across the country, as some members moved to other states to continue their quorum-bust. Senate Republicans changed the chamber's rules to remove the quorum requirements, attempting to lure Democrats back to the state to fight the changes in court.

Democrats were unable to block the redistricting package during a third special session, but they staged a symbolic walkout as the package neared passage to delay it over the weekend. After this brief delay, the Senate passed the redistricting bill, ending the six month long legislative saga. Federal courts allowed the maps to be used for the 2004 elections, but Democrats vowed to appeal it to the Supreme Court. The map was ultimately successful for Republicans, as they won five Democratic-held seats, while a sixth Democrat, Ralph Hall, switched parties, giving Republicans a majority in Texas' congressional delegation for the first time since Reconstruction, and helping the party maintain their majority in the U.S. House of Representatives.

Supreme Court review (2006) 
Democrats' challenge to the Republican's map made it all the way to the Supreme Court as League of United Latin American Citizens v. Perry. They argued that Republicans had used both racial and partisan gerrymandering when drawing the 23rd, 24th, and 25th districts. While the Court rejected the partisan gerrymandering claims, as well as racial gerrymandering claims in the 24th and 25th districts, they agreed that the 23rd district was gerrymandered against Hispanic voters. The courts redrew the district, as well as four other nearby districts; however, as the maps were not completed until after the primaries, the courts voided the results of the primaries, forcing all five districts to conduct special elections concurrent with the 2006 general election instead. The redrawn boundaries, as well as a low-turnout December runoff, allowed Democrat Ciro Rodriguez to unseat Republican Henry Bonilla in the 23rd district.

Republican dominance (2010s) 
Although Democrats nearly won control of the Texas House in the 2008 elections, Republicans erased all of their gains in 2010, gaining a supermajority of seats after two party switches. This gave Republicans a very strong legislative advantage heading into the 2012 redistricting cycle. Texas gained four seats in the U.S. House of Representatives after the 2010 census, and Texans believed that Republicans would draw most of the state's new districts to favor themselves. The legislature did not complete its maps during the regular session, so governor Rick Perry called a special session. The legislature passed its map during the special session, which drew criticism from minority groups for ignoring their population growth over the past decade. The Department of Justice sued the state for racial discrimination, and a federal court re-drew the state's map, but the U.S. Supreme Court overturned this decision, holding that the court had not paid enough attention to the maps drawn by the legislature. The Supreme Court upheld the state's redistricting plan in 2018.

The Texas Legislature passed boundaries for itself in 2011, but the Justice Department denied them preclearance. A federal court in San Antonio implemented interim maps for the 2012 elections, which somewhat closely followed the Legislature's initial maps. In 2013, the U.S. Supreme Court in Shelby County v. Holder ruled the preclearance requirement of the Voting Rights Act unconstitutional. This rendered the Justice Department's preclearance lawsuits moot, but the Legislature had already adopted the San Antonio judge's redistricting maps into law in a 2013 special session, with minor changes to the Texas House's districts. The Supreme Court later upheld the entirety of Texas' maps inAbbott v. Perez with the exception of House District 90, which it ruled to be an unconstitutional racial gerrymander.

Stifling a Democratic resurgence (2020s) 

In the 2018 elections, Democrats made major gains in the Texas House and Texas Senate, and they saw the 2020 elections as a chance to win control of the Texas House to give them power over the redistricting process in 2021. While Democrats came close to flipping several seats, they made no net gains in the 2020 elections, leaving Republicans with full control of the Texas Legislature for the 2020 redistricting cycle. Texas gained two seats in the U.S. House of Representatives as a result of the 2020 census. The maps Republicans proposed allowed Democrats to keep the two House seats they gained during the 2018 elections, the 7th and 32nd congressional districts, but they made every district that Republicans nearly lose in 2018 and 2020 significantly more Republican-leaning. Legislators drew the maps for the state during a special session in Fall 2021. 

The maps that passed were widely criticized as racial and partisan gerrymanders designed to keep Republicans in power and reduce the voting power of minorities. News sources specifically noted that both of Texas' new congressional districts were majority white, despite voters of color making up 95% of the state's growth in the previous decade. Multiple groups, including the Justice Department, have sued the state over these maps. Additionally, the Mexican American Legislative Caucus is currently arguing in MALC v. Abbott that part of the Texas House map violates the "county line rule."

Possibilities for reform 
Due to Texas' long history of racial and partisan gerrymandering, many have called for the establishment of an independent redistricting commission for the state. The Legislature is seen as unlikely to give up its own redistricting power, however, and Texas has no citizen-led ballot initiative process to bypass it.

See also 

 Elections in Texas
 Political party strength in Texas
 2020 United States Census
 2020 United States redistricting cycle

References 

Redistricting in the United States
Politics of Texas
Government of Texas